Firm Friends is a British drama series written and created by Lou Wakefield which was broadcast on ITV from 16 June 1992 to 18 August 1994. The series stars Billie Whitelaw as Rose Gutteridge and Madhur Jaffrey as Jayshree Kapoor. The show was produced by Zenith Entertainment in association with Tyne Tees Television for the ITV network.

Cast
Billie Whitelaw as Rose Gutteridge
Madhur Jaffrey as Jayshree Kapoor
Zohra Sehgal as Suvira Bhatia
Michelle Holmes as Maggie Coles
Badi Uzzaman as Puran Kapoor
Derek Fowlds as John Gutteridge
Alexander Morton as DI Hogg
John McArdle as Peter Cresswell
Tony Doyle as Michel Gutteridge
Allen Mechen as Baz

Series overview

References

External links
 

1992 British television series debuts
1994 British television series endings
1990s British drama television series
ITV television dramas
1990s British television miniseries
Television series by ITV Studios
Television shows produced by Tyne Tees Television
English-language television shows
Television shows set in County Durham
Television shows set in Newcastle upon Tyne
Television shows set in Tyne and Wear